Thomas Rider  may refer to:

 Thomas Rider (MP for Kent) (1785–1847)
Thomas Rider (MP for Windsor), 16th century MP for Windsor
Thomas Rider (MP for Maidstone) (c. 1648 - by Sep 1704), MP for Maidstone

See also
Thomas Ryder (disambiguation)